The 1904 Toledo Athletic Association football team was an American football team that represented the Toledo Athletic Association in the 1904 college football season.

Schedule

Roster

 Hadding, left end
 Shepard, left tackle
 Suek, left guard
 Brubaker, center
 Krause, right guard
 Fred Merkle right tackle
 Fassett, right end
 B. Tattersall, quarterback
 Cruse, right halfback
 Naguer, left halfback
 J. Tattersall (captain), fullback

References

Toledo Athletic Association
Toledo Athletic Association football seasons
Toledo Athletic Association football